Conor Laerenbergh (born 18 March 1993) is a Belgian footballer who plays as an attacking midfielder for Sint-Niklaas in the Belgian Third Division.

References

1993 births
Living people
Beerschot A.C. players
Royal Antwerp F.C. players
Belgian Pro League players
Challenger Pro League players
Sportkring Sint-Niklaas players
Association football midfielders
Belgian footballers